Ibadullah Khan (born 15 November 1974) is a Pakistani politician who has been a member of the National Assembly of Pakistan, since August 2018. He is the Chairman of Standing Committee on Communications in National Assembly, since April 2019. Previously he was a member of the National Assembly from June 2013 to May 2018.

Early life

He was born on 15 November 1974.

He is brother of Amir Muqam.

Political career

He served as former district nazim of Shangla.

Ibad Ullah was elected to the National Assembly of Pakistan as a candidate of Pakistan Muslim League (N) (PML-N) from Constituency NA-31 (Shangla) in 2013 Pakistani general election. He received 30,916 votes and defeated a candidate of Awami National Party (ANP). During his tenure as Member of the National Assembly, he served as the Federal Parliamentary Secretary for Planning and Development.

He was re-elected to the National Assembly as a candidate of PML-N from Constituency NA-10 (Shangla) in 2018 Pakistani general election. He received 34,070 votes and defeated Sadeed ur Rehman, a candidate of ANP.

References

Living people
Pakistan Muslim League (N) MNAs
Pashtun people
Pakistani MNAs 2013–2018
1974 births
Pakistani MNAs 2018–2023